The following is a list of company or product names derived from indigenous peoples, excluding geographic names.

Companies
 Crazy Horse (Liz Claiborne clothing line)
 Indian  Manufacturing Company
 Mohawk Airlines
 Mohawk Gasoline
 Niagara-Mohawk Power Company, now part of National Grid USA
 Sioux Chief Manufacturing
 Fishawack Health

Products
 American Indian herbal cigarettes
 Inca Cola, soft drink
 Indian Head corn meal
 MBDA Apache missile
 Mohawk steam locomotive
 Mohawk tile and carpet
 Mohawk Vodka
 Quechua, maker of outdoor gear
 Red Man, chewing tobacco
 Ticonderoga pencils
 Wamsutta sheets

Automobiles
 Chevrolet Apache
 Chevrolet Cheyenne
 Dodge Dakota
 Ford Thunderbird
 Jeep Cherokee
 Jeep Comanche
 Jeep Grand Cherokee
 Mazda Navajo
 Nissan Qashqai (ethnic group from around Iran)
 Pontiac (brand)
 Pontiac Aztek
 Pontiac Chieftain
 Pontiac Star Chief
 Pontiac Super Chief
 Toyota Tacoma
 Volkswagen Touareg (North African desert tribe)
 Volkswagen Taos
 Winnebago

Aviation

Civilian
 Piper PA-23 Apache
 Piper PA-23 Aztek
 Piper PA-24 Comanche
 Piper PA-25 Pawnee
 Piper PA-28 Cherokee
 Piper PA-28-236 Dakota
 Piper PA-31 Navajo
 Piper PA-31P-350 Mojave
 Piper PA-31T Cheyenne
 Piper PA-34 Seneca
 Piper PA-44 Seminole

Military
 AH-56 Cheyenne
 AH-64 Apache
 Boeing-Sikorsky RAH-66 Comanche
 C-12 Huron
 CH-21 Shawnee
 CH-47 Chinook
 Douglas C-47 Skytrain, called Dakota by the British and Commonwealth air forces
 H-13 Sioux
 H-34 Choctaw
 OH-58 Kiowa
 OV-1 Mohawk
 TH-67 Creek
 U-8 Seminole
 UH-1 Iroquois
 UH-72 Lakota

Computing
 Apache Geronimo
 Apache HTTP Server
 Aztec C
 Cherokee HTTP Server
 Hiawatha HTTP Server

Services

Railroad
 Southwest Chief, indirect descendant of the Super Chief, a run operated by Amtrak
 Super Chief, former (and famous) passenger run on the Santa Fe Railroad

Baking supplies
 Calumet, brand of baking powder taken from a French colonial-era name used for some ceremonial pipes

See also
 Indigenous peoples
 List of sports team names and mascots derived from indigenous peoples

References

Indigenous peoples
Indigenous peoples
Indigenous peoples
Anti-indigenous racism in the United States